Ophiuchus (astrological symbol ) has sometimes been suggested in sidereal astrology as a 13th astrological sign in addition to the 12 signs of the tropical zodiac. The constellation Ophiuchus, as defined by the 1930 International Astronomical Union's  constellation boundaries, is situated behind the sun from November 29 to December 18.

The idea appears to have originated in 1970 with Steven Schmidt's suggestion of a 14-sign zodiac, also including Cetus as a sign.

However, in sidereal and tropical astrology (including sun sign astrology), a 12-sign zodiac is based on dividing the ecliptic into 12 equal parts rather than the IAU constellation boundaries. That is, astrological signs do not correspond to the constellations which are their namesakes, particularly not in the case of the tropical system where the divisions are fixed relative to the equinox, moving relative to the constellations.

History

The constellation is described in the astrological poem of Marcus Manilius as the one that winds in loops: "But, bending its supple neck, the serpent looks back and returns: and the other's hands slide over the loosened coils. The struggle will last forever, since they wage it on level terms with equal powers". Later in his poem, he describes the astrological influence of Ophiuchus, when the constellation is in its rising phase, as one which offers affinity with snakes  and protection from poisons, saying "he renders the forms of snakes innocuous to those born under him. They will receive snakes into the folds of their flowing robes, and will exchange kisses with these poisonous monsters and suffer no harm".  A later 4th century astrologer, known as Anonymous of 379, associated "the bright star of Ophiuchus", Ras Alhague (α Ophiuchi), with doctors, healers or physicians (ἰατρῶν), which may have been because of the association between poisons and medicines.

Based on the 1930 IAU constellation boundaries, suggestions that there are "13 astrological signs" because "the Sun is in the sign of Ophiuchus" between November 30 and December 18 have been published since at least the 1970s.

In 1970, Steven Schmidt in his Astrology 14 advocated a 14-sign zodiac, introducing Ophiuchus (December 6 to December 31) and Cetus (May 12 to June 6) as new signs.
Within 20th-century sidereal astrology, the idea was taken up by  Walter Berg in the form of his book, The 13 Signs of the Zodiac (1995).

In January 2011, a statement by Parke Kunkle, an astronomer at the Minnesota Planetarium Society, repeated the idea of "the 13th zodiac sign Ophiuchus" which made some headlines in the popular press.

References

Astrological signs
13 (number)